In the Steps of Romans, officially In the footsteps of the Romans, is a multi-day road cycling race held annually in Bulgaria. The race has been held since 2019 as a category 2.2 event on the UCI Europe Tour.

Winners

References

UCI Europe Tour races
Recurring sporting events established in 2019
2019 establishments in Bulgaria
Cycle races in Bulgaria